John Henry Lolla (May 10, 1886 – June 23, 1932) was an American Negro league second baseman in 1909 and 1910.

A native of Bowling Green, Kentucky, Lolla played for the Indianapolis ABCs in 1909 and 1910. He died in Indianapolis, Indiana in 1932 at age 46.

References

External links
Baseball statistics and player information from Baseball-Reference Black Baseball Stats and Seamheads

1886 births
1932 deaths
Indianapolis ABCs players
Baseball second basemen
Baseball players from Kentucky
Sportspeople from Bowling Green, Kentucky
20th-century African-American people